The women's 52 kg competition of the 2014 World Judo Championships was held on 26 August.

Medalists

Results

Finals

Repechage

Pool A

Pool B

Pool C

Pool D

Notes
A.Kelmendi did not compete under the Kosovo's flag this year but under the International Judo Federation flag instead.

Prize money
The sums listed bring the total prizes awarded to 14,000$ for the individual event.

References

External links
 
 Draw

W52
World Judo Championships Women's Half Lightweight
World W52